Bactra punctistrigana is a moth of the family Tortricidae. It is known from Namibia, Madagascar, Mozambique, Nigeria, South Africa and Zimbabwe.

References

Bactrini
Moths described in 1900